Cunnamulla is a 2000 Australian documentary directed by Dennis O'Rourke about the town Cunnamulla in Queensland, Australia. The film was highly controversial due to its depiction of life in an Australian outback town and the techniques used to make the film.

References

External links
Cunnamulla at SBS Movie Show
Cunnamulla at IMDb
Cunnamulla at Screen Australia
Cunnamulla at Oz Movies

2000 films
Australian documentary films
2000s Australian films